The rivière aux Anglais (English: English's River) is a tributary of the St. Lawrence River, flowing in the unorganized territory Rivière-aux-Outardes and in the territory of the town Baie-Comeau, in the Manicouagan Regional County Municipality, on the administrative region of Côte-Nord, in the province of Quebec, in Canada.

The rivière aux Anglais is a watercourse with salmons. At the beginning of 20th century, it had many lakes on its route.

The rivière aux Anglais valley is served mainly by "chemin de la rivière aux Anglais" and the lower part, by the route 138.

Forestry is the main economic activity in this valley.

The surface of the rivière aux Anglais is usually frozen from the beginning of December to the end of March, except the rapids areas; however, safe circulation on the ice is generally from mid-December to mid-March.

Geography 
This river rises on the Canadian Shield, from an unidentified lake. This lake is located on the south side of Lac Blanc.

It flows in an almost entirely forest environment and its flow is regulated by three hydraulic works belonging to the company Resolute Forest Products.

Upper course of the English river (segment of )

  first west on  down the cliff, then south in the marsh area, then crossing Savard Lake, to its mouth. Note: Lac Savard receives the outlet (coming from the east) from Lac Paul;
  towards the south-east, in particular by crossing on  the Lac à la Loutre, to its mouth. Note: A village of around forty buildings is located at the mouth of Lac à la Loutre and downstream of the dam;
  to the east, relatively in a straight line, in particular crossing Lake Pascal over its full length, bending south at the end of the segment, to the confluence of the Françoise River (coming from the east);
  first towards the south-west, then towards the south-east in a deep valley, relatively in a straight line, up to a bend of the river corresponding to the confluence of the Tremblay River (coming from the southeast);

Intermediate course of the English river (segment of )

  towards the south-west in a deep valley by collecting the Brisson River (coming from the north-west), crossing a series of rapids, then forming a hook towards the south, to a bend corresponding to the outlet (coming from the west) of a lake;
  towards the south-east by forming a loop towards the north to a bend in the river where the course is oriented towards the east by forming serpentines, up to a bend of river (corresponding to a stream coming from the north);
  towards the south-east by winding in a deep valley and collecting numerous streams, then crossing on  the Fer à Cheval lake, to its mouth. Note: The "Fer à Cheval lake" collects the Épinette River (coming from the west) via "Lac Cinq Cents";
  towards the northeast, in particular by crossing an unidentified lake, up to at its mouth;
  to the east by crossing rapids, then crossing on  the lac La Chesnaye where the current curves north to its mouth;

Lower course of the English river (segment of )

  towards the east by collecting the Larouche stream (coming from the north), then curving towards the south crossing the Unknown lake, to its mouth;
  to the south in a deep valley, crossing a small lake, collecting the discharge (coming from the east) from Lake Ethier, collecting the discharge (coming from the west) from Lac Léon, bending towards the south-east and crossing the Lac de la Rivière aux Anglais, up to dam located at its mouth. Note: route 138 passes at the foot of this dam;
  towards the south-west with a drop in level of  crossing several zones of rapids, until its mouth.

Its mouth spills out onto the west shore of the Baie des Anglais, on the north shore of the Estuary of Saint Lawrence, in the eastern part of the town of Baie-Comeau. This confluence is located on the north side of the facilities of the company Resolute Forest Products.

Activities 
The English river was used for sport fishing until 1983. From that date, fishing was prohibited in order to protect the habitat of Atlantic salmon. Part of it is declared a salmon sanctuary.

Part of the river is diverted to Lac à la Chasse thanks to the facilities of the Resolute Forest Products paper mill. This lake is used to supply process and domestic water to the paper mill and the aluminum smelter Alcoa. The aluminum smelter then supplies the cereal Cargill and until August 2018 the Saint-George district. The Lac à La Chasse feeds until July 2018 the eastern sector of the town of Baie-Comeau, namely the Sainte-Amélie and Saint-Nom-de-Marie districts. The paper mill also supplied part of the Sainte-Amélie district. All residents of Baie-Comeau are now supplied by the new water treatment plant built in 2018 which draws its water from the Manicouagan River.

Toponym 
The toponym "Rivière aux Anglais" was formalized on August 2, 1974, at the Place Names Bank of the Commission de toponymie du Québec.

See also 

List of rivers of Quebec

References 

 .

Manicouagan Regional County Municipality